Scopula humilis is a moth of the  family Geometridae. It is found in north-western India.

References

Moths described in 1913
humilis
Moths of Asia